Yehor Klymenchuk (born 11 November 1997) is a Ukrainian professional footballer who plays as a midfielder for Metalist Kharkiv.

Career
Klymenchuk is a product of FC Shakhtar and FC Metalurh Zaporizhya youth team systems.

He made his debut for Metalurh Zaporizhya in the Ukrainian Premier League in a match against FC Dynamo Kyiv on 30 May 2015.

On 3 June 2022, Ararat-Armenia announced that Klymenchuk's contract had expired and he would leave the club.

Honours

Ararat-Armenia
Armenian Premier League (1): Runner Up 2021–22

References

External links
 
 
 

1997 births
Living people
Footballers from Zaporizhzhia
Ukrainian footballers
Association football midfielders
Ukrainian expatriate footballers
Ukrainian expatriate sportspeople in Armenia
Expatriate footballers in Armenia
Ukrainian expatriate sportspeople in Belarus
Expatriate footballers in Belarus
Ukrainian Premier League players
FC Metalurh Zaporizhzhia players
FC Minsk players
FC Naftan Novopolotsk players
FC Kolos Kovalivka players
FC Kramatorsk players
FC Olimpik Donetsk players
FC Lviv players
FC Ararat-Armenia players
FC Metalist Kharkiv players